Rhabdochaeta guamae is a species of tephritid or fruit flies in the genus Rhabdochaeta of the family Tephritidae.

Distribution
Guam.

References

Tephritinae
Insects described in 1942
Diptera of Asia